Marvin H. Matuszak (September 12, 1931 – February 28, 2004) was an American football linebacker in the National Football League and in the American Football League. He went to two NFL Pro Bowls and was once an AFL All-Star during his 12-year pro football career. After retiring, he was an assistant coach in the pros for 16 seasons for five different teams. The South Bend native was inducted into the Indiana Football Hall of Fame in 1987.

He is often erroneously called the father of former NFL defensive lineman John Matuszak. John's father's middle initial is "F" and he was still living when a photo of the family gravestone was taken in 2007. Hence, this Marvin H. Matuszak who died in 2004 is not John's father.

See also
Other American Football League players

References

1931 births
2004 deaths
American football linebackers
Tulsa Golden Hurricane football players
Pittsburgh Steelers players
San Francisco 49ers players
Green Bay Packers players
Baltimore Colts players
Buffalo Bills players
Denver Broncos (AFL) players
Eastern Conference Pro Bowl players
Western Conference Pro Bowl players
American Football League All-Star players
Denver Broncos coaches
Atlanta Falcons coaches
American Football League players